Ivan Broz (21 January 1852 – 25 December 1893) was a Croatian linguist and literary historian.

Biography

Broz was born in Klanjec where he attended primary school, then moved to primary school in Varaždin, and gymnasium in Karlovac, Požega, and Zagreb, where he graduated. In Innsbruck, he started studying theology, but eventually abandoned it in order to study Croatian language, history, and geography at the newly established Croatian university in Zagreb. He served as a substitute teacher in Zagreb, and as a regular teacher in the upper secondary schools in Osijek, Požega, and Zagreb. He received his PhD in 1888, attended Vatroslav Jagić's lectures on Slavic studies in Vienna, and set off on a fieldwork journey across Bosnia and Herzegovina and southern Croatia, where he eventually grew ill, which was the cause of his death. Ivan Broz died in Zagreb.

Work

In 1885 in Matica hrvatska he was appointed the editor of Hrvatske narodne pjesme (Croatian folk songs). In his Crtice iz hrvatske književnosti (two volumes) he gave an extensive overview of the oldest Croatian literary monuments. He authored a study on the Croatian imperative and numerous puristic articles (Filologičke sitnice). In 1889 he was appointed to make a normative guide for Croatian.

In 1892 he published his most important work, Hrvatski pravopis (Croatian Normative Guide), which was reprinted under the editorship of Dragutin Boranić's until 1916. That normative guide, strictly based on Karadžić-Daničić's normative conception, but formed chiefly upon the normative role model of the Croatian philologist Marcel Kušar, established the Croatian standard, with most of the later Croatian normative manuals in most of the prescriptions being but mere stylisations of Broz's ground-breaking work.

Being the most moderate philologist among the Croatian "Vukovians," Broz left a deep mark in the final standardisation of Croatian: thanks to him, there was no normative duality, which was threatened by the introduction of phonologically based spelling in Dalmatia and Bosnia (manual by Frane Vuletić), and by the introduction of some rules from the normative standard of the Zagreb school (separate writing of the future tense, writing foreign names as in the original, avoiding voicing assimilation in most cases (podcijeniti, odčepiti, etc.), morphological forms in several cases (mladac/mladci, etc.)). He established firm ground for continuity with the older (chiefly Dubrovnik) normative tradition and secured a painless transition to the final normative form, avoiding a controversy like that which closely followed the linguistic interventions of his contemporary Tomislav Maretić.

Sources

1852 births
1893 deaths
Linguists from Croatia
Croatian lexicographers
19th-century lexicographers